Bear Island is the southernmost island of the Norwegian Svalbard archipelago. The island is located in the western part of the Barents Sea, approximately halfway between Spitsbergen and the North Cape. Bear Island was discovered by Dutch explorers Willem Barentsz and Jacob van Heemskerck on 10 June 1596. It was named after a polar bear that was seen swimming nearby. The island was considered terra nullius until the Spitsbergen Treaty of 1920 placed it under Norwegian sovereignty.

Despite its remote location and barren nature, the island has seen commercial activities in past centuries, such as coal mining, fishing and whaling. However, no settlements have lasted more than a few years, and Bear Island is now uninhabited except for personnel working at the island's meteorological station Herwighamna. Along with the adjacent waters, it was declared a nature reserve in 2002.

History

Seafarers of the Viking era may have known Bear Island, but the documented history begins in 1596, when Willem Barents sighted the island on his third expedition. He named this island "Vogel Eylandt", "Bird Island" in English. Steven Bennet conducted further exploration in 1603 and 1604 and noted the then rich population of walrus. Starting in the early 17th century, the island was used mainly as a base for the hunting of walrus and other species of seals. Also, the eggs of seabirds were harvested from the large bird colonies until 1971.

The Muscovy Company claimed Bear Island for the English Crown in 1609, but it abandoned the site when walrus-hunting declined. A Russian settlement existed in the 18th century and its remains were later used as a basis for territorial claims by Imperial Russia in 1899 and again by the Soviet Union in 1947.

Bear Island has never been extensively settled. The remnants of a whaling station from the early 20th century can be seen at Kvalrossbukta ("walrus bay") in the southeast. From 1916 through 1925, coal was mined at a small settlement named Tunheim on the northeastern coast, but then the mining was given up as unprofitable. Due to the cold climate, the remains of the settlement, including a half-destroyed jetty and a steam locomotive, are relatively well-preserved.

The strategic value of Bear Island was recognised in the late 19th century, when Imperial Russia and Imperial Germany demonstrated their interests in the Barents Sea. The German journalist and adventurer Theodor Lerner visited the island in 1898 and 1899 and claimed rights of ownership. In 1899, the German fishery association Deutscher Seefischerei-Verein (DSV) started investigations of whaling and fishery in the Barents Sea. The DSV was secretly in contact with the German naval command and considered the possibility of an occupation of Bear Island. In reaction to these advances, the Russian Navy sent out the protected cruiser  to investigate, and the Russians hoisted their flag over Bear Island on July 21, 1899. Although Lerner protested the action, no violence occurred and the matter was settled diplomatically with no definitive claims of sovereignty over Bear Island by any nation.

The whole island was privately owned by the coal mining company of Bjørnøen AS from 1918 to 1932, when the Norwegian state took over the shares. Bjørnøen AS now exists as a state-owned company, and it is jointly managed with Kings Bay AS, the company that runs the operations of Ny-Ålesund on Spitsbergen. A Norwegian radio station (Bjørnøya Radio, callsign: LJB) was established in Herwighamna on the northern coast in 1919. It was later extended to include a meteorological station.

In 1932 and 1933 the island was a site of the first Polish polar expedition, related to the second International Polar Year. Three researchers - Czesław Centkiewicz (who later recounted the expedition in his book Wyspa Mgieł i Wichrów), Władysław Łysakowski and Stanisław Siedlecki stayed there for entire winter conducting meteorological and geophysical observations.

Since the shipping routes from the Atlantic Ocean to the ports of the arctic White Sea pass through the Barents Sea, the waters near Bear Island were of some strategic importance during World War II as well during as the Cold War. Although Svalbard was not occupied by Germany, the Kriegsmarine built several weather stations there. 
An automated radio station was deployed on Bjørnøya in 1941. German forces attacked several arctic convoys with military supplies bound for the Soviet Union in the waters surrounding Bear Island. They inflicted heavy losses upon the Convoy PQ 17 of June/July 1942, but they were ineffective in the Battle of the Barents Sea on New Year's Eve 1942. The waters southeast of Bear Island were the scene of more naval battles in 1943. 
In November 1944, the Soviet Union proposed to annul the Spitsbergen Treaty with the intention of gaining sovereignty over Bear Island. Negotiations with Trygve Lie of the Norwegian government-in-exile did not lead to an agreement by the end of World War II, and the Soviet proposals were never carried out. The Soviet Union (and later, Russia) maintained some presence on Spitsbergen, however.

In 2002 a nature reserve was established that covers all of the island, except  around the meteorological station. The reserve also includes the adjacent waters of a  radius from the coast. 
Today, the island's only inhabitants are the nine or so members of the staff of the Norwegian meteorological station and radio station at Herwighamna. 
This station carries out meteorological observations and provides logistic and telecommunication services, including a radio watch on the HF channels 2182/2168 and the VHF channels 16/12. Weather forecasts are transmitted from the station twice daily, announced on HF 2182/VHF 16. 
The station also has landing platforms for use by helicopters of the Norwegian Coast Guard, the Norwegian 330 Squadron, and the Governor of Svalbard. The Norwegian Polar Institute conducts annual expeditions to Bear Island, mostly concerned with ornithological research. Several other research projects, mostly pertaining to geography and climatology, are carried out less regularly. There are very few opportunities for individual travel to Bjørnøya.

Amateur radio operators occasionally conduct DXpeditions on the island during the summer months.

Geography 

It is in the westernmost part of the Barents Sea on Spitsbergen Bank, which extends southward from Spitsbergen and Edgeøya, forming a part of the continental shelf.

Other notable mountains are Antarcticfjellet in the southeast, and Fuglefjellet, Hambergfjellet and Alfredfjellet in the southwest. The northern part of the island forms a lowland plain that covers some two thirds of the surface area.

Apart from a few sandy beaches, the coast is mostly steep, with high cliffs and notable signs of erosion such as caverns and isolated rock pillars. A number of anchorages and landing points exist, as well as a small harbor at Herwighamna on the north coast.

Hydrography 
Norwegian government agencies have conducted hydrographic surveys of Svalbard waters throughout the 20th century. Land surveying and mapping are the responsibilities of the Polar Institute.

Several streams flow into the ocean, often via waterfalls along the steeper parts of the coast. There are known glaciers on Bear Island.

Climate 

Bear Island, located well south of the main islands in the Svalbard Archipelago, has the mildest climate in Svalbard. A branch of the North Atlantic current carries warm water to the west of Svalbard, passing Bear Island on its way. This influences climate, making it much warmer than other polar regions at similar latitude. Bear Island's climate is maritime and polar (Köppen ET) with relatively high temperatures during the winter, and a large amount of precipitation. The large winter precipitation is very unusual in a high polar region, a result of Atlantic Lows sometimes going this far northeast due open sea southwest of Bear Island. The record high  was recorded June 1953. The record low  is from March 1927.

While winters are very long, the maritime moderation and the delay of salt water ice formation makes Bear Island have much less cold winters than a lot of mid-latitude climates on the larger continental landmasses. In summer, the maritime influence causes seasonal lag. This means that August is slightly milder than July, which is extremely uncommon on high latitudes. The seasonal lag is extreme in the winter with the coldest month being March and April being colder than December.

The weather can be quite stable during the summer months, although foggy conditions are common, occurring during 20% of all days in July. Fog develops when the warm air of the Atlantic Ocean, from farther south, passes over cold water. The average monthly precipitation is lowest in May, and highest in September and October. 

Because Bear Island lies on a boundary between cold water of polar origin and warmer Atlantic water, water temperatures within a few dozen nautical miles of the island are quite variable, sometimes reaching  in summer. During the winter fast ice develops on the coast, but it is rare on the open sea around Bear Island. The Barents Sea carries pack ice to Bjørnøya every winter, but a significant amount of ice is not common before February.

The polar night lasts from about November 8 through February 3, and the period of midnight sun from about May 2 through August 11. With just 595 hours of bright sunshine per year, Bear Island has the lowest average yearly sunshine in Europe.

Earlier climate normal for Bear Island with sunhours

Flora and fauna 

Bear Island was the site of a pioneering ecological study by Victor Summerhayes and Charles Elton in the early 1920s, which produced one of the first food web diagrams. There is a little plant growth, consisting mostly of moss and some scurvy grass, but no trees.

The only indigenous land mammals are a few Arctic foxes. Despite its name, Bear Island is not a permanent residence of polar bears, although many arrive with the expanding pack ice in the winter. Occasionally, a bear will stay behind when the ice retreats in spring and remain through the summer months. Moreover, the sub-population of Ursus maritimus polar bears found here is a genetically distinct set of polar bears associated with the Barents Sea region.

Ringed seal and bearded seal, prey of the polar bear, live in the waters near Bjørnøya, but the formerly common walruses have nowadays become guests. Bear Island's freshwater lakes are the home of some arctic fish species like the Arctic char.

Birds 

The only land birds are snow buntings and rock ptarmigans, but the island is rich in seabirds that nest on the southern cliffs. Other species visit the island during their seasonal migration between Svalbard's northern islands and mainland Europe.

Bear island has been identified as an Important Bird Area (IBA) by BirdLife International. It supports breeding populations of northern fulmars (50,000–60,000 pairs), purple sandpipers, red phalaropes (10 pairs), glaucous gulls (2000 pairs), black-legged kittiwakes (100,000 pairs), little auks (10,000–100,000 pairs), common guillemots (50,000 pairs), thick-billed guillemots (190,000 individuals) and black guillemots (1000 pairs).

It also supports migratory populations of pink-footed geese (30,000 individuals), barnacle geese and long-tailed ducks.

Environmental concerns
Although there are currently no industrial activities on Bjørnøya or in its immediate vicinity, pollution by toxic and radioactive substances remains a threat to the island's virtually untouched nature. Exploration in the Barents sea and the recent development of the Snøhvit gas field off the northern coast of Norway shows that the ecologically sensitive polar and subpolar sea areas of the Norwegian and Barents Sea have come into the focus of the petrol and gas industry. The environmental organisation Bellona has criticised the Norwegian government for licensing these activities without sufficient studies of their ecological impact. Organic toxins, specifically PCBs, have been found in high concentrations in biological samples from Bear Island, especially in Arctic char of the freshwater lake Ellasjøen. Leakage of radioactive material from the reactor and nuclear warheads currently poses a problem, and severe pollution of the surrounding waters remains possible.

Culture
Surfing has been documented in the movie Bjørnøya – følg drømmen.

Books

“The Last Bear”, a storybook by Hannah Gold is surrounding Bear Island and Svalbard. The story depicts a girl named April, who must, with her father, go to the Arctic to research for a duration of 6 months. During these 6 months, April secretly helps a wounded bear to escape the island to Svalbard. 

There is also a novel named Bear Island by Alistair MacLean.

See also
 Bear Island, a novel by Alistair MacLean which is set on Bear Island
 List of islands of Norway

References

External links

Publications of administrative and general interest are issued by the Governor of Svalbard . Maps, research reports, and scholarly works about Svalbard-related subjects are available from the Norwegian Polar Institute .

Books
 Bear Island: The story of an isolated arctic island – exploration, people, culture and nature by Dag Kjelldahl

General information
 Website of the meteorological station on Bear Island
 Report to the Storting (1999–2000) on Svalbard by the Norwegian Ministry of Justice and the Police – extensive report on political, administrative, economical and scientific matters relating to Svalbard

Time Zone
 TimeGenie.com – Central Europe Time zone. Standard Time difference compared to UTC/GMT is +1 hours

Maps and photos:
 Bear Island nature reserve (JPEG image) – from the Office of the Governor of Svalbard
 An interactive map of Svalbard – Bear Island included
 Detailed map northeastern part (PDF) showing the location of the meteorological station near the top
 Detailed map southern part (PDF)
 Map showing the location of Bear Island in relation to Svalbard – from the Norwegian Polar Institute
 Strategic Arctic outpost – pictorial introduction to Bear Island, from Norwegian newspaper Aftenposten, September 6, 2005

Geography, hydrography, meteorology:
 Geology of Bear Island, Norway – by Dr. Harmon D. Maher Jr., Dept of Geography and Geology, University of Nebraska at Omaha
 Svalbards geological development – By Winfried Dallmann, Norwegian Polar Institute.
 Bjørnøya and the island's meteorological station – by the Norwegian Meteorological Institute
Monthly temperature, precipitation normals 1961–1990 – upper table: temperature (°C); lower table: precipitation (mm)
Sea ice charts of the Bjørnøya area – updated daily on weekdays

History:
 "Meteorological operations in the Arctic 1940–1945" – by Franz Selinger; on World War II German Arctic meteorology services, incl. TAAGET station, Bjørnøya

Recent events:
 Two Russian vessels arrested at Bear Island for violation of fishing regulations

 
Islands of Svalbard
Seabird colonies
Islands of the Barents Sea
Nature reserves in Svalbard
Important Bird Areas of Svalbard
1590s in the Dutch Empire
Ramsar sites in Norway